James Brown, OBE, DL (16 December 1862 – 21 March 1939) was a Scottish Labour politician.

Biography
James brown was born in the Whitletts area of Ayr, to James Brown (1839-1895) and Christina O'Hara (1840-1923) but lived most of his life in Annbank where he went to school. In 1888, he married Catherine McGregor Steel who was 3 years his senior and they had 5 children together, Christina Brown (died young), James Brown (died young), Matthew Brown (1891-1969), John Brown (1893-1946) and David Brown (1896-1916), their son David died in WW1.
He lived most of his life in Annbank where he went to school. He had started working in pits from the age of 12 and he later would become Secretary of the Ayrshire Miners' Union and of the Scottish Miners' National Union. He unsuccessfully contested North Ayrshire in January 1910 and was the Member of Parliament (MP) for South Ayrshire from 1918–1931 and from 1935 until his death in 1939. He was awarded the OBE in 1917, appointed a Privy Counsellor in 1930.  He was Lord High Commissioner to the General Assembly of the Church of Scotland in 1924, 1930 and 1931, despite having a salary of £10,000 he and his wife refused to move out of their little £10 cottage. Some people called him the "Uncrowned King of Annbank" in his later years, and he also taught in the local sunday school in Annbank.

He was a member of the Scottish National War Memorial committee formed in 1918 by the then Secretary of State for Scotland, the Liberal Party MP Robert Munro, which was tasked with forming a permanent memorial for World War I at Edinburgh Castle. In 1927 he criticised the decision to include Walter Thomas Monnington's painting Parliamentary Union of England and Scotland, 1707 in the Palace of Westminster which he said in a debate should "get rid of this disgraceful picture and put something in its place which would be more true to history than it is." His Labour Party colleague, Dundee MP Tom Johnston further described the outrage at the inclusion of the painting by saying "the only historical painting in St Stephen's Hall representing an incident in Scottish history deals with an act of national humiliation."

In his authorised biography Bill Shankly said that Brown won the election in South Ayrshire as the local voters "wouldn't vote Conservative" but that he was "too mild" and not a "keen socialist" for some of the more militant Labour members.

He was granted the Freedom of the Royal Burgh of Ayr in 1930, and of Girvan in 1931 and was awarded an Honorary LLD by the University of Glasgow in 1931. He was a Deputy Lieutenant of Ayrshire.

His life story "From Pit To Palace" by Alexander Gammie was published in 1931. He was the great-uncle of the future first Presiding Officer of the Scottish Parliament David Steel.

James Brown died on 21 March 1939 in Ayr at the age of 76 from acute gastritis and myocardial failure, with his children by his side. It was reported his last words were "Look after Katie" which referred to his wife, who was bedridden at home. She later died in 1942.

References

External links 
 

1862 births
1939 deaths
Deputy Lieutenants of Ayrshire
Scottish Labour MPs
Members of the Privy Council of the United Kingdom
Miners' Federation of Great Britain-sponsored MPs
Officers of the Order of the British Empire
UK MPs 1918–1922
UK MPs 1922–1923
UK MPs 1923–1924
UK MPs 1924–1929
UK MPs 1929–1931
UK MPs 1935–1945
Scottish miners
Lords High Commissioner to the General Assembly of the Church of Scotland
People from South Ayrshire